Samdech is a Cambodian honorific bestowed by the King of Cambodia to individuals deemed to have made significant contributions to the nation. It roughly translates as "lord". It is often accompanied by a longer title; for instance, Prime Minister Hun Sen's full title is Samdech Akka Moha Sena Padei Techo Hun Sen (meaning "Lord Supreme Military Commander Hun Sen"). Some members of the royal family and religious leaders also have "Samdech" as part of their title. In July 2016, the government ordered the media to use leaders' full titles.

The title used to be a rarity as under King Norodom Sihanouk's first reign (1941–1955), only four politicians had received the title including Penn Nouth, Nhiek Tioulong, Son Sann, and Chau Sen Cocsal Chhum, all of whom have served as prime minister.

Known recipients

Monarchs

Royalty

Politicians

Religious leaders

References

See also

Supreme Patriarch of Cambodia
Social class in Cambodia
Lord
Samdech Euv (disambiguation)

Honorifics
Honorary titles
Noble titles
Politics of Cambodia